Jack Cera is a former member of the Ohio House of Representatives, representing the 96th district.

Career 
A Democrat, Cera was appointed to his current term to replace Lou Gentile, who left to assume a seat in the Ohio Senate. Cera previously served in the Ohio House of Representatives from 1983 to 1996, when he was forced to resign because of new legislation introducing term limits.

Personal life 
When not conducting official business related to his service in the House, he served as head of the Jefferson–Belmont Regional Solid Waste Authority and in various voluntary positions in Belmont County. Cera is married with two daughters.

References

Living people
Democratic Party members of the Ohio House of Representatives
Brown University alumni
People from Bellaire, Ohio
Year of birth missing (living people)
21st-century American politicians